= Publicly owned =

Publicly owned can refer to:

- Public utility, a publicly owned utility that provides infrastructure and sometimes services
- Public company, a company which is permitted to offer its securities for sale to the general public
- State ownership, also known as public ownership, of government-owned corporations
